Naoko Sakurai (born 9 December 1953) is a Japanese equestrian. She competed in the individual dressage event at the 1988 Summer Olympics.

References

1953 births
Living people
Japanese female equestrians
Japanese dressage riders
Olympic equestrians of Japan
Equestrians at the 1988 Summer Olympics
Place of birth missing (living people)
Asian Games medalists in equestrian
Equestrians at the 1986 Asian Games
Asian Games silver medalists for Japan
Medalists at the 1986 Asian Games
20th-century Japanese women